T. V. R. Shenoy (10 June 1941 – 17 April 2018) was a journalist and columnist of India. Shenoy had served as the Editor of the weekly news magazine The Week and Sunday Mail and held various posts in Indian Express and Malayala Manorama.

Shenoy contributed to several national and international newspapers, website and magazines on issues ranging from national politics, economy, social issues, international affairs to current affairs. He regularly contributed articles and opinion to Indian Express, Gulf News, Rediff.com, Newstime and Mathrubhumi and Indiafirstfoundation.org.

He was a native of  Cherayi, Ernakulam, Kerala.

He was a member of the Board of Trustees of India First Foundation. He was awarded the Padma Bhushan award in 2003.

He died on 17 April 2018 at the Kasturba Hospital in Manipal. He is survived by his wife, Saroja, and their two children, a son, Ajit, and a daughter, Sujatha. He is also survived by Sujatha's two children, twins.

References

External links
India First Foundation
Kamat.com

1941 births
2018 deaths
Recipients of the Padma Bhushan in other fields
Journalists from Kerala
Maharaja's College, Ernakulam alumni
Indian columnists